The 2016 Extreme Sailing Series was the tenth edition of the sailing series and the sixth year of it being a fully global event. 2016 saw the series move away from the Extreme 40 catamaran, and into the GC32 foiling catamaran.

Acts

Act 1: Muscat, Oman 
The first act of the series was held in Muscat, Oman on the weekend of 16–19 February 2016.

Act 2: Qingdao, China 
Qingdao, China was the host of the second act of the 2016 series, on the weekend of 27 April–1 May 2016.

Act 3: Cardiff, UK 
For the fifth time, Cardiff, Wales was again a host city, it was held on the weekend of 24–26 June 2016.

Act 4: Hamburg, Germany 
Hamburg, Germany was, for the second time, a venue for the series, held on 14–17 July 2016.

Act 5: St. Petersburg, Russia 
The fifth act was held in Saint Petersburg, Russia, the second time as a venue in the Extreme Sailing Series. It was held on the weekend of 25–28 August 2016.

Act 6: Madeira Islands, Portugal 
The sixth act was held in Funchal at Madeira Island, for the first time, on the weekend of 22–25 October 2016.

Act 7: Lisbon, Portugal 
Lisbon hosted the Series on the weekend of 6–9 October 2016. (Previously, it was scheduled to be in Istanbul, Turkey.)

Act 8: Sydney, Australia 
Act 8 was held on the weekend of 8–11 December 2016 in Sydney, Australia. This was the third year that Sydney hosted the series.

Teams
The crews included:

Alinghi

Co-Skipper/Helm: Ernesto Bertarelli (SUI)
Co-Skipper/Mainsail Trimmer: Arnaud Psarofaghis (SUI)
Tactician: Nicolas Charbonnier (FRA)
Headsail Trimmer: Nils Frei (SUI)
Bowman: Yves Detrey (SUI)

Land Rover BAR Academy

Skipper: Bleddyn Môn (GBR)
Helm: Leigh McMillan (GBR)
Crew: Ed Powys (GBR)
Academy trialists: Adam Kay (GBR)/Oli Greber (GBR)/James Peters (GBR)/Neil Hunter (GBR)

Oman Air

Skipper/Helm: Morgan Larson (USA)
Mainsail Trimmer: Pete Greenhalgh (GBR)
Headsail Trimmer: Ed Smyth (NZL/AUS)
Bowmen: Nasser Al Mashari (OMA)/James Wierzbowski (AUS)

Red Bull Sailing Team

Skipper/Helm: Roman Hagara (AUT)
Tactician: Hans Peter Steinacher (AUT)
Mainsail Trimmer: Stewart Dodson (NZL)
Headsail Trimmer: Adam Piggott (GBR)
Bowman: Brad Farrand (NZL)

Sail Portugal

Skipper/Helm: Diogo Cayolla (POR)
Tactician: Bernardo Freitas (POR)
Mainsail Trimmer: Javier de la Plaza (ESP)
Headsail Trimmer: Luís Brito (POR)
Bowman: Winston Macfarlane (NZL)

SAP Extreme Sailing Team
Co-Skipper/Helm: Jes Gram-Hansen (DEN)
Co-Skipper/Tactician: Rasmus Køstner (DEN)
Mainsail Trimmer: Mads Emil Stephensen (DEN)
Headsail Trimmer: Pierluigi De Felice (ITA)
Bowman: Renato Conde (POR)

Team Turx

Co-Skipper/Floater: Edhem Dirvana (TUR)
Co-Skipper/Helm: Stevie Morrison (GBR)
Mainsail Trimmer: Cem Gözen (TUR)
Headsail Trimmer: Alister Richardson (GBR)
Bowman: Anil Berk Baki (TUR)

Results 

 = Did Not Start

References

External links 
 
 Official gallery

2016
GC32 competitions
2016 in sailing
2016 in Omani sport
2016 in Chinese sport
2016 in German sport
2016 in Welsh sport
2016 in Russian sport
2016 in Turkish sport
2016 in Australian sport
Sports competitions in Cardiff